As Miss Beelzebub Likes is an anime series adapted from the manga of the same title by matoba. The series is directed by Minato Kazuto at Liden Films, with Yoriko Tomita written the scripts. Etsuko Sumimoto designed the characters, while Satoshi Motoyama is the sound director. Kanon Wakeshima and naotyu- composed the series' music. The series aired from October 11 to December 27, 2018 on ABC and other channels. The opening theme is  performed by Sangatsu no Phantasia, while the ending theme is a character song titled  and performed by Saori Ōnishi, Misaki Kuno, and Ai Kakuma. Crunchyroll streamed the series and it ran for 12 episodes.


Episode List

Notes

References

As Miss Beelzebub Likes